Frank Walter Rayner was an English professional footballer who played as a wing half. He played almost 100 games in the Football League before his career was cut short by the Second World War.

References

Footballers from South Yorkshire
English footballers
Association football defenders
Charlton Athletic F.C. players
Barnsley F.C. players
Rotherham United F.C. players
Mansfield Town F.C. players
Burnley F.C. players
Notts County F.C. players
English Football League players
Year of birth missing
Year of death missing
People from Goldthorpe